This is a list of deputy prime ministers of Cambodia. There are currently ten holders of this position.

List of deputy prime ministers

References 

Government ministers of Cambodia
Cambodia